The Texas Trail, better known as the Texas Road but also known as the Shawnee Trail, Sedalia Trail or the Kansas Trail, was a historic cattle trail which was used to drive cattle from Texas to Ogallala, Nebraska and other locations on the Union Pacific Railway in Nebraska.  This emerged as an alternative to the Chisholm Trail which had brought cattle to Abilene, Kansas and other locations on the Kansas Pacific Railroad.

Near Imperial, Nebraska are portions of a dry stone corral which served the trail.  The corral was built c.1876;  it is listed on the National Register of Historic Places as Texas Trail Stone Corral.

According to one source the last cattle drive over the trail was in 1884, but others say there were drives later.

The XIT Ranch used the Texas Trail, connecting Tascosa to Dodge City until 1885.  That was when the quarantine line was extended to southwestern Kansas.

See also
 Great Western Cattle Trail

References

Trails and roads in the American Old West
Historic trails and roads in Nebraska
Historic trails and roads in Texas